This Is Christmas is the first Christmas album by American singer Luther Vandross. It was released on October 18, 1995, by Epic Records. Produced by Vandross along with Nat Adderley Jr. and Marcus Miller, the album received mixed to negative reviews from music critics and peaked at number 28 on the US Billboard 200 and number 4 at both Billboards Top Holiday Albums and Top R&B/Hip-Hop Albums. A steady seller throughout the Christmas season, it was eventually certified platinum by the Recording Industry Association of America (RIAA), exceeding physical sales of 1,000,000 copies in 2002.

The same year, Sony Music Special Products repackaged six of the album's tracks with two spiritual tracks from other albums, as Home for Christmas, and reissued the entire album again in October 2012 as part of The Classic Christmas Album line with additional tracks. The two editions of the album had sold a combined total of 1,147,000 copies as of December 2012. This is Christmas lent its name to a syndicated television special Vandross hosted which aired in November and December 1995, and featured songs from this album, as well as performances by his special guests.

Track listing

Notes
"The Christmas Song" from the album A Very Special Christmas 2 (1992)
"Have Yourself a Merry Little Christmas" (Live) (duet with Chaka Khan) from the Soul Train Christmas Starfest (1998)
"May Christmas Bring You Happiness" and "At Christmas Time" from the album Funky Christmas (1976)

Personnel 

 Luther Vandross – lead vocals, backing vocals, arrangements (2, 3, 4, 7, 9), vocal arrangements (2, 3, 7, 8, 9), spoken vocals (3)
 John Anderson – acoustic piano (1, 8), synthesizers (1, 8), drums (1, 7-9), arrangements (1-4, 7-9), keyboards (2, 3, 7, 9), Fender Rhodes (4)
 Jason Miles – synthesizer sound programming (1-4, 7-9),drum programming (1-4, 7-9)
 Reed Vertelney – keyboards (2), drum programming (2), arrangements (2)
 Ivan Hampden Jr. – keyboards (3), drums (3, 5, 6, 9, 10), arrangements (3, 9)
 Nat Adderley Jr. – acoustic piano (4, 5, 6, 10), string arrangements (4), keyboards (5, 6), arrangements (5, 6)
 Eric Caudieux – synthesizer sound programming (5, 6)
 Paul Jackson Jr. – guitar (2-5, 7-10)
 Phil Hamilton – guitar (5, 6)
 Marcus Miller – bass (3, 4, 10), keyboards (10), Hammond B3 organ (10), arrangements (10), choir conductor (10)
 Luico Hopper – bass (5, 6)
 Eluriel "Tinker" Barfield – bass (7)
 Erroll "Crusher" Bennett – percussion (5)
 Steve Kroon – percussion (6)

 Dick Oatts – tenor saxophone solo (5, 6)
 Clarence Clemons – tenor saxophone solo (7)
 Richard Marx – arrangements (4)
 Earl McIntyre – horn orchestration (5, 6)
 Peter Dimitriades – string concertmaster (6)
 Alfred Brown – string contractor (6)
 John Clayton – string arrangements and conductor (10)
 Emile Charlap – orchestra contractor (10)
 Tawatha Agee – backing vocals (2, 3, 7, 8, 9)
 Robin Clark – backing vocals (2, 3, 7, 8, 9)
 Milt Grayson – backing vocals (2)
 Cissy Houston – backing vocals (2, 3, 7, 9)
 Paulette McWilliams – backing vocals (2, 3, 7, 8, 9)
 Cindy Mizelle – backing vocals (2, 3, 7, 8, 9)
 Fonzi Thornton – backing vocals (2, 3, 7, 8, 9), vocal contractor,vocal arrangements (7)
 Brenda White-King – backing vocals (2, 3, 7, 9)
 Darlene Love – backing vocals (3), lead vocals (7)
 Kevin Owens – backing vocals (7)

Choir on "O' Come All Ye Faithful"
 Tawatha Agee, Katreese Barns, Vivian Cherry, Robin Clark, Ada Dyer, Genobia Jeter, Yvonne Lewis, Paulette McWilliams, Kevin OwensTamira C. Sanders, Valerie Simpson, Fonzi Thornton (choir contractor)

Production

 Luther Vandross – producer (1-4, 7-9), executive producer 
 Nat Adderley Jr. – producer (5, 6)
 Marcus Miller – producer (10)
 Ray Bardani – audio recording (1-4, 7-9), lead vocal recording (5, 6, 9), mixing
 Paul Brown – audio recording (5, 6)
 Stan Wallace – audio recording (5, 6)
 Dan Wojnar – audio recording (9)
 Joe Ferla – orchestra recording (9)
 David Ward – additional recording, sound designer (10)
 Tony Duino-Black – assistant engineer 
 Paul Falcone – assistant engineer 
 Robert Friedrich – assistant engineer 

 Carl Glanville – assistant engineer 
 Geraldo Lopez – assistant engineer 
 Aya Takemura – assistant engineer 
 Max Risenhoover – digital editing (1-5, 7-10)
 Eric Caudieux – digital editing (2, 5, 7)
 Ted Jensen – mastering 
 Marsha Burns – project coordinator 
 George Corsillo – design
 Patti Manzone – design 
 Alberto Tolot – photography 
 Jeff Jones – hair, makeup

Charts

Weekly charts

Year-end charts

Certifications

References

1995 Christmas albums
Pop Christmas albums
Albums produced by Luther Vandross
Albums produced by Marcus Miller
Christmas albums by American artists
Contemporary R&B Christmas albums
Epic Records albums
Luther Vandross albums